When Hell.A. Freezes Over is the fourth studio album by American rapper Frost. It was released on July 1, 1997, through Ruthless/Relativity Records. The album features guest appearances from Domino, Slow Pain, O.G.Enius, Ice-T, and Frost's son Scoop DeVille.

The album peaked at #154 on the Billboard 200 and #64 on the Top R&B/Hip-Hop Albums chart. Its only single, "What's Your Name (Time of the Season)", also made it to #90 on the Hot R&B/Hip-Hop Songs chart and #32 on the Hot Rap Songs chart.

Track listing

Chart history

References

External links

1997 albums
Frost (rapper) albums
Ruthless Records albums
Albums produced by Fredwreck
Gangsta rap albums by American artists